Mullock is a surname. Notable people with the surname include:

 John T. Mullock (1807–1869), Roman Catholic bishop of St. John's, Newfoundland
 Julia Mullock (born 1928), disputed member of the Korean Imperial Household
 Richard Mullock (1851–1920), Welsh sporting administrator and official

 Mullock may also refer to waste tailings from metal ore mining.